Lucasville  is a Black Nova Scotian settlement within the Halifax Regional Municipality in the Canadian province of Nova Scotia.

The community was established by James Lucas and Moses Oliver in 1827, then known as Lucas Settlement. Actor Eli Goree was raised in Lucasville.
 In 1970, Lucasville had a Black population of 200.

References
Explore HRM

Communities in Halifax, Nova Scotia
General Service Areas in Nova Scotia
Black Canadian settlements